Levan Makashvili (born January 7, 1989) is a Georgian-American mixed martial artist currently competing in the Lightweight division of Absolute Championship Akhmat. A professional competitor since 2013, he has also competed for the UFC, Fight Nights Global and CES MMA. He is ranked #10 in the ACA featherweight rankings.

Background
Born and raised in the central Georgian town of Gori, Makashvili competed in wrestling before moving to the United States in 2013 in an attempt to enhance his mixed martial arts career.

Mixed martial arts career
Makashvili made his professional debut in September 2011 and amassed a record of 10–1 before signing with the Ultimate Fighting Championship in February 2015.

Ultimate Fighting Championship
Makashvili was expected to make his promotional debut against Nik Lentz on February 14, 2015, at UFC Fight Night 60.  However, the pairing was scrapped just prior to the weigh-ins as Lentz was stricken with flu-like symptoms.

Makashvili eventually made his debut on May 16, 2015, as he faced Mark Eddiva at UFC Fight Night 66. He won the fight via split decision.

Makashvili faced Hacran Dias on June 27, 2015, at UFC Fight Night 70, filling in as a short notice replacement for Chas Skelly. He lost the fight via split decision.

Makashvili faced Damon Jackson on January 30, 2016, at UFC on Fox 18. The bout was ruled a majority draw (28-28, 28-28, 29-27) after Makashvili was deducted one point in the third round due to an illegal knee and eye poke.

Fight Nights Global
Makashvili faced Rasul Mirzaev on 16 November 2016 at Fight Nights Global 54. He won the fight via unanimous decision.

Makashvili next faced Jack McGann at Fight Nights Global 62: Matmuratov vs. Kurzanov on March 31, 2017. He won the fight via unanimous decision.

Absolute Championship Akhmat
After two bouts in FNG, Makashvili signed with Absolute Championship Akhmat after a two and a half year hiatus. He made his promotional debut against Attila Korkmaz at ACA 101: Strus vs. Nemchinov on November 15, 2019. He won the fight via unanimous decision.

His sophomore bout was against Magomedrasul Khasbulaev at ACA 104: Goncharov vs. Vakhaev on February 21, 2020. He lost the fight via unanimous decision.

He then faced Roman Dik at ACA 109: Strus vs. Haratyk on August 20, 2020. He won the fight via second-round knockout.

Next he faced Aurel Pirtea at ACA 114: Omielańczuk vs. Johnson on November 26, 2020. He lost the fight via split decision.

Makashvili faced Elismar Lima da Silva on April 23, 2021, at ACA 122. He won the bout via unanimous decision.

Makashvili faced Herdeson Batista at November 18, 2021, at ACA 132: Johnson vs. Vakhaev. He lost the bout via unanimous decision.

Makashvili faced Leonardo Limberger on March 6, 2022, at ACA 137. He won the bout via split decision.

Makashvili faced Tural Ragimov on August 13, 2022, at ACA 142. He won the bout via unanimous decision.

Makashvili faced Kurban Taygibov on December 16, 2022, at ACA 149. He lost the bout via unanimous decision.

Professional MMA record

|-
|Loss
|align=center|20–6–1
|Kurban Taygibov
|Decision (unanimous)
|ACA 149: Vagaev vs Slipenko
|
|align=center|3
|align=center|5:00
|Moscow, Russia
|
|-
|Win
|align=center|20–5–1
|Tural Ragimov
|Decision (unanimous)
|ACA 142: Gadzhidaudov vs Amagov
|
|align=center|3
|align=center|5:00
|Kazan, Russia
|
|-
| Win
| align=center|19–5–1
|Leonardo Limberger
|Decision (split)
|ACA 137: Magomedov vs. Matevosyan
|
|align=center|3
|align=center|5:00
|Krasnodar, Russia
| 
|-
| Loss
| align=center|18–5–1
|Herdeson Batista
|Decision (unanimous)
|ACA 132: Johnson vs. Vakhaev
|
|align=center|3
|align=center|5:00
|Minsk, Belarus
|
|-
| Win
| align=center|18–4–1
| Elismar Lima da Silva
| Decision (unanimous)
|ACA 122: Johnson vs. Poberezhets
|
|align=center|3
|align=center|5:00
|Minsk, Belarus
| 
|-
| Loss
| align=center|17–4–1
| Aurel Pîrtea
| Decision (split)
|ACA 114: Omielańczuk vs. Johnson
|
|align=center|3
|align=center|5:00
|Łódź, Poland
| 
|-
| Win
| align=center|17–3–1
| Roman Dik
| KO (punches)
| ACA 109: Strus vs. Haratyk
| 
| align=center|2
| align=center|4:38
| Łódź, Poland
| 
|-
| Loss
| align=center|16–3–1
| Magomedrasul Khasbulaev
| Decision (unanimous)
| ACA 104: Goncharov vs. Vakhaev
| 
| align=center|3
| align=center|5:00
| Krasnodar, Russia
|
|-
|Win
|align=center| 16–2–1
|Attila Korkmaz
|Decision (unanimous)
|ACA 101: Strus vs. Nemchinov
|
|align=center|3
|align=center|5:00
|Warsaw, Poland
|  
|-
|Win
|align=center| 15–2–1
|Jack McGann
|Decision (unanimous)
|Fight Nights Global 62: Matmuratov vs. Kurzanov
|
|align=center|3
|align=center|5:00
|Moscow, Russia
|
|-
|Win
|align=center| 14–2–1
|Rasul Mirzaev
|Decision (unanimous)
|Fight Nights Global 54: Pavlovich vs. Kudin
|
|align=center|3
|align=center|5:00
|Rostov-on-Don, Russia
|
|-
|Win
|align=center| 13–2–1
|Sean Soriano
|Submission (rear-naked choke)
|CES MMA 38: Soriano vs. Makashvili
|
|align=center|2
|align=center|4:05
|Lincoln, Rhode Island, United States
|
|-
|Win
|align=center| 12–2–1
|Ryan Sanders
|Decision (unanimous)
|CES MMA 36: Andrews vs. Muro
|
|align=center|3
|align=center|5:00
|Lincoln, Rhode Island, United States
|
|-
|Draw
|align=center|11–2–1 
|Damon Jackson
|Draw (majority)
|UFC on Fox: Johnson vs. Bader
|
|align=center|3
|align=center|5:00
|Newark, New Jersey, United States
|
|-
|Loss
|align=center|11–2
|Hacran Dias
| Decision (split)
|UFC Fight Night: Machida vs. Romero
|
|align=center|3
|align=center|5:00
|Hollywood, Florida, United States
|
|-
|Win
|align=center| 11–1
|Mark Eddiva
|Decision (split)
|UFC Fight Night: Edgar vs. Faber
|
|align=center|3
|align=center|2:08
|Pasay, Philippines
|
|-
|Win
|align=center| 10–1
|Alexandre Bezerra
|Decision (unanimous)
|CFFC 44
|
|align=center|5
|align=center|5:00
|Bethlehem, Pennsylvania, United States
|
|-
| Loss
|align=center| 9–1
|Alexandre Bezerra
|Decision (majority)
|CFFC 38
|
|align=center|5
|align=center|5:00
|Atlantic City, New Jersey, United States
|
|-
| Win
|align=center| 9–0
| Scott Heckman
| TKO (punches)
|CFFC 35
|
|align=center| 4
|align=center| 2:30
|Atlantic City, New Jersey, United States
|
|-
| Win
|align=center| 8–0
|Jordan Stiner
| Decision (unanimous)
|CFFC 32
|
|align=center|3
|align=center|5:00
|King of Prussia, Pennsylvania, United States
|
|-
| Win
|align=center| 7–0
|Tom English
| KO (punch)
|ROC 46
|
|align=center|2
|align=center|1:39
|Atlantic City, New Jersey, United States
|
|-
| Win
|align=center| 6–0
|Thomas Wash
| TKO (punches)
| Turf Wars 11
|
|align=center|1
|align=center|0:17
|Florence, Kentucky, United States
|
|-
| Win
|align=center| 5–0
|Anthony Facchini
| Decision (unanimous)
|ROC 44
|
|align=center|3
|align=center|4:00
|Atlantic City, New Jersey, United States
|
|-
| Win
|align=center| 4–0
|Levan Kveselava
| TKO (punches)
|GUFF-Determination 
|
|align=center|1
|align=center|2:05
|Gori, Georgia
|
|-
| Win
|align=center| 3–0
|Garik Abriamiani
| TKO (punches
|GUFF-Batubi Circus
|
|align=center|3
|align=center|1:11
|Batumi, Georgia
|
|-
| Win
|align=center| 2-0
|Giorgi Aptsiauri
| Decision (unanimous)
|Georgian Universal Fighting Federation
|
|align=center|3
|align=center|3:00
|Kutaisi, Georgia
|
|-
| Win
|align=center| 1–0
|Giorgi Turashvili
| TKO (punches)
|Georgian Universal Fighting Federation
|
|align=center|1
|align=center|0:51
|Gori, Georgia
|
|}

Amateur MMA record

|-
|Win
|align=center| 2–0
|Lashawn Alcocks
| Decision (split)
|RDMMA - Battle in the South 4
|
|align=center|4
|align=center|3:00
|Wilmington, North Carolina, USA
|
|-
|Win
|align=center| 1–0
|Raul Tutarauli
| Decision (unanimous)
|Georgian Universal Fighting Federation
|
|align=center|3
|align=center|5:00
|Gori, Georgia
|
|}

See also
 List of current ACA fighters
 List of male mixed martial artists

References

External links
 UFC Profile
 

1989 births
Living people
People from Gori, Georgia
Male mixed martial artists from Georgia (country)
American male mixed martial artists
Mixed martial artists from New York (state)
Featherweight mixed martial artists
Mixed martial artists utilizing wrestling
Mixed martial artists utilizing Brazilian jiu-jitsu
Georgian emigrants to the United States
Brazilian jiu-jitsu practitioners from Georgia (country)
American practitioners of Brazilian jiu-jitsu
Ultimate Fighting Championship male fighters